The Men's Super-G competition of the Nagano 1998 Olympics was held at Hakuba on Monday, February 16.

The defending world champion was Atle Skardal of Norway, France's Luc Alphand was the defending World Cup Super G champion, and Markus Wasmeier of Germany was the defending Olympic champion; all three had since retired from competition.

Just three days after a spectacular crash in the downhill, Austria's Hermann Maier returned to win the gold medal, and teammate Hans Knauss tied for the silver with Didier Cuche of Switzerland.

Results
The race was started at 08:45 local time, (UTC +9).

References

External links
FIS results
Results

Men's Super-G
Winter Olympics